Anti-monarchism in Japan was a minor force during the twentieth century.

History 
In 1908, a letter allegedly written by Japanese revolutionaries denied the Emperor's divinity, and threatened his life. In 1910, Kōtoku Shūsui and 10 others plotted to assassinate the Emperor. In 1923, 1925 and 1932 Emperor Shōwa survived assassination attempts.

After World War II, the communists were antagonistic to the Emperor. The Japanese Communist Party demanded the abolition of the emperor system. They boycotted the formal opening of the National Diet in 1949 because of Emperor Shōwa's presence. The Japanese Communist Party continued to be antagonistic after Emperor Shōwa's death in 1989.

During the Imperial visits to Otsu, Japan in 1951, and  Hokkaido in 1954, Communist posters and handbills antagonistic to the Imperial Family Members were plastered in the cities.

In 1951, three thousand students in Kyoto University protested against Emperor Shōwa's continued reign.

See also 
 Japanese dissidence during the Shōwa period
 Assassination attempts on Hirohito
 Aki no Arashi
 Hantenren

External links

References 

Japanese Resistance
Left-wing politics in Japan
Republicanism in Japan